Ceratophyllus sclerapicalis is a species of flea in the family Ceratophyllidae. It was described by Liyuen, Wenching and Chiying in 1974.

References 

Ceratophyllidae
Insects described in 1974